John Conlan may refer to:

Jocko Conlan (1899–1989), Hall of Fame baseball umpire
John Bertrand Conlan (1930–2021), U.S. Representative from Arizona; son of Jocko Conlan
John Conlan (Kildare politician), Irish Farmers' Party politician, represented Kildare in the 1920s
John Conlan (Monaghan politician) (1928–2004), Irish Fine Gael politician